Colette Privat (14 November 1925 – 7 April 2021) was a French politician. A member of the French Communist Party, she represented the Seine-Maritime department in the National Assembly.

Biography
She then served as an assistant professor in 1978.

Privat joined the French Communist Party in 1946. She became the first female General Councillor of the Canton of Maromme, serving from 1967 to 2004 as she was re-elected five times. Her platform centered around education.

Privat was elected to represent Seine-Maritime's 4th constituency in the National Assembly, serving from 1967 to 1968 and again from 1978 to 1981. During the events of May 68, she put forth a motion to condemn the Gaullist regime in which she stated ""ten years after taking power […] Refusing any real dialogue, forced students, teachers, peasants, workers and unemployed youth to resort to street demonstrations of an exceptional scale."

Privat was elected Mayor of Maromme in 1977 and was re-elected continuously until 1998. During her tenure, she rebuilt the city center and expanded the commune's cultural, sporting, social, and educational facilities. She also approved the development of two industrial complexes.

On 1 February 2014, Privat became a friend of L'Humanité newspaper along with Charles Silvestre, Régine Deforges, Axel Kahn, and Gérard Mordillat.

Colette Privat died on 7 April 2021 at the age of 95.

References

1925 births
2021 deaths
20th-century French politicians
21st-century French politicians
Women members of the National Assembly (France)
Deputies of the 3rd National Assembly of the French Fifth Republic
Deputies of the 6th National Assembly of the French Fifth Republic
Mayors of places in Normandy
Departmental councillors (France)
French Communist Party politicians
Politicians from Paris
20th-century French women
21st-century French women
Members of Parliament for Seine-Maritime